Lydick is an unincorporated community in Warren Township, St. Joseph County, in the U.S. state of Indiana.

The community is part of the South Bend–Mishawaka, IN-MI, Metropolitan Statistical Area.

History
Lydick originally had three different names, which were Warren Center, Sweet Home, and Lindley.

A post office opened under the name Warren Centre in 1839. It was renamed to Sweet Home in 1885, and in 1902 was renamed again to Lindley. It was renamed once more to Lydick in 1909, and was discontinued in 1913. In the early years, there was a south shore station during the time. As of now, it is truncated and does not exist. The location is unknown, but assuming it is near the now Lydick church. 

Website  was developed for places, and things to do inside Lydick, Indiana.

Geography

References

Unincorporated communities in St. Joseph County, Indiana
Unincorporated communities in Indiana
South Bend – Mishawaka metropolitan area